Navdeepak Singh Chahal better known by his stage name Gavie Chahal, is an Indian actor who primarily works in Hindi and Punjabi cinema.

Career 
Chahal won the title of Mr. Punjab in 2000. His first music video, "Jattan de putt saadh ho gaye" was a success, after which he appeared in many music videos. In 2005, he shifted to Mumbai where he grabbed a role in the successful daily soap Kyunki Saas Bhi Kabhi Bahu Thi, produced by Balaji Telefilms, but later, he left the show to act in the Punjabi film Yaaran Naal Baharan. In 2011, Chahal signed for playing Shivendu Kaushik in Mrs. Kaushik Ki Paanch Bahuein, Broadcast on Zee TV, but later he left the show in March 2012 as he had to shoot for the Bollywood film Ek Tha Tiger. He also participated in the AXN's adventure show Fear Factor, in which he won the championship. He is known for his Hindi film debut in Yash Raj's 2012 film Ek Tha Tiger.

Filmography

Films
 Yaaran Naal Baharan (2005)
 Mehndi Wale Hath (2006)
 Majajan (2008)
 Tere ishq Nachaya (2010)
 Pinky Moge Wali (2012)
 Ek Tha Tiger as Captain Abrar, 2012
 Saada Jawai NRI
 Saako 363
 iPhone Mann (2014)
 Yaarana
 Pinda Vicho Pinda Sunida (2016)
 Yeh Hai India (2019)
 Chicken Biryani (2017)
 Tiger Zinda Hai as Captain Abrar (2017)
 Haunted Hills (2020)
 Hum Sab Ullu Hain (2015)
 Tiger 3 as Captain Abrar (2023)

Television

Music videos

References

External links
 
 
 

Indian male television actors
Punjabi people
Indian male models
Living people
1978 births
Male actors in Punjabi cinema
People from Punjab, India
Male actors in Hindi cinema
21st-century Indian male actors
Indian Sikhs